John McAvoy (born 1878) was a Scottish professional footballer who played as a full-back.

References

1878 births
Scottish footballers
Association football fullbacks
Celtic F.C. players
Airdrieonians F.C. players
Arsenal F.C. players
Grimsby Town F.C. players
English Football League players
Year of death missing
Date of birth missing
Place of death missing